Cryptosporidium, sometimes informally called crypto, is a genus of apicomplexan parasitic alveolates that can cause a respiratory and gastrointestinal illness (cryptosporidiosis) that primarily involves watery diarrhea (intestinal cryptosporidiosis), sometimes with a persistent cough (respiratory cryptosporidiosis).

Treatment of gastrointestinal infection in humans involves fluid rehydration, electrolyte replacement, and management of any pain. , nitazoxanide is the only drug approved for the treatment of cryptosporidiosis in immunocompetent hosts.  Supplemental zinc may improve symptoms, particularly in recurrent or persistent infections or in others at risk for zinc deficiency.  Cryptosporidium oocysts are 4–6 μm in diameter and exhibit partial acid-fast staining. They must be differentiated from other partially acid-fast organisms including Cyclospora cayetanensis.

General characteristics 
Cryptosporidium causes cryptosporidiosis, an infection that may present as a diarrhoea, sometimes with a persistent cough in immunocompetent hosts. Other apicomplexan pathogens include the malaria parasite Plasmodium and the toxoplasmosis parasite Toxoplasma. Unlike Plasmodium, which transmits via a mosquito vector, Cryptosporidium does not use an insect vector, and is capable of completing its lifecycle within a single host, resulting in cyst stages that are excreted in feces or through inhalation of coughed on fomites and are capable of transmission to a new host.

A number of Cryptosporidium species infect mammals. In humans, the main causes of disease are C. parvum and C. hominis (previously C. parvum genotype 1). C. canis, C. felis, C. meleagridis, and C. muris can also cause disease in humans.

Cryptosporidiosis is typically an acute, short-term infection, can be recurrent through reinfection in immunocompetent hosts, and become severe or life-threatening in immunocompromised individuals. In humans, it remains in the lower intestine and may remain for up to five weeks. The parasite is transmitted by environmentally hardy cysts (oocysts) that, once ingested, exist in the small intestine and result in an infection of intestinal epithelial tissue. Transmission by ingestion or inhalation of coughed on fomites is a second, less likely route of infection.

The genome of Cryptosporidium parvum, sequenced in 2004, was found to be unusual amongst eukaryotes in that the mitochondria seem not to contain DNA. A closely related species, C. hominis, also has its genome sequence available.

Life cycle

Cryptosporidium has three developmental stages: meronts, gamonts and oocysts. They reproduce within the intestinal epithelial cells. 
The Cryptosporidium spore phase (oocyst) can survive for lengthy periods outside a host. It can also resist many common disinfectants, including chlorine-based disinfectants.

Water treatment and detection 
Many treatment plants that take raw water from rivers, lakes, and reservoirs for public drinking water production use conventional filtration technologies. Direct filtration, which is typically used to treat water with low particulate levels, includes coagulation and filtration but not sedimentation. Other common filtration processes including slow sand filters,  diatomaceous earth filters, and membranes will remove 99% of Cryptosporidium. Membranes and bag- and cartridge-filter products remove Cryptosporidium specifically.

Cryptosporidium is highly resistant to chlorine disinfection; but with high enough concentrations and contact time, Cryptosporidium inactivation will occur with chlorine dioxide and ozone treatment. In general, the required levels of chlorine preclude the use of chlorine disinfection as a reliable method to control Cryptosporidium in drinking water. Ultraviolet light treatment at relatively low doses will inactivate Cryptosporidium. Calgon Carbon-funded research originally discovered UV's efficacy in inactivating Cryptosporidium.

One of the largest challenges in identifying outbreaks is the ability to verify the results in a laboratory.  The oocytes may be seen by microscopic examination of a stool sample, but they may be confused with other objects or artifacts similar in appearance. Most cryptosporidia are 3–6 μm in size, although some reports have described larger cells.

Boiling is believed to be the safest option for water contaminated by Cryptosporidium.

Epidemiology

Exposure risks 
 People who swim regularly in pools with insufficient sanitation (certain strains of Cryptosporidium are chlorine-resistant)
 Child-care workers
 Parents of infected children
 People caring for other people with cryptosporidiosis
 Backpackers, hikers, and campers who drink unfiltered, untreated water
 People who visit petting farms and open farms with public access
 People, including swimmers, who swallow water from contaminated sources
 People handling infected cattle
 People exposed to human feces
 People who turn compost that has not gone through its phase where temperatures over 50ºC are reached

Dealing with stabilized compost - i.e. composting material that has gone through the phases where micro-organisms are digesting the organic matter and the temperature inside the composting pile has reached temperature up to 50-70ºC - poses very little risk as these temperatures kill pathogens and even make oocysts unviable.

Like many fecal-oral pathogens, the disease can also be transmitted by contaminated food, poor hygiene or turning compost in a local compost site.  Testing of water, as well as epidemiological study, are necessary to determine the sources of specific infections. Cryptosporidium typically does not cause serious illness in healthy people. It may chronically sicken some children, as well as adults exposed and immunocompromised.  A subset of the immunocompromised population is people with AIDS. Amongst men who have sex with men who have AIDS, insertive anal sex is an increased risk factor.  Analingus and oral-genital sex after anal-genital sex are known transmission routes.

Other transmission routes include exposure to laboratory specimens.

See also 
 1987 Carroll County Cryptosporidiosis outbreak
 1993 Milwaukee Cryptosporidiosis outbreak
 1998 Sydney water crisis
 Escherichia coli
 Giardia lamblia

References

Further reading

External links 

 CryptoDB: The Cryptosporidium Genome Resource

Apicomplexa genera
Conoidasida